Tetyana Horb (born 18 November 1965 in Cherkasy) is a Ukrainian former handball player who competed for the Soviet Union in the 1988 Summer Olympics and for the Unified Team in the 1992 Summer Olympics. She played for Spartak Kiev.

In 1988 she won the bronze medal with the Soviet team. She played in all five matches and scored ten goals.

Four years later she was a member of the Unified Team which won the bronze medal. She played in all five matches and scored 14 goals.

External links
profile

1965 births
Living people
Sportspeople from Cherkasy
Soviet female handball players
Ukrainian female handball players
Olympic handball players of the Soviet Union
Olympic handball players of the Unified Team
Handball players at the 1988 Summer Olympics
Handball players at the 1992 Summer Olympics
Olympic bronze medalists for the Soviet Union
Olympic bronze medalists for the Unified Team
Olympic medalists in handball
Medalists at the 1992 Summer Olympics
Medalists at the 1988 Summer Olympics
Honoured Masters of Sport of the USSR
Spartak athletes
Sportspeople from Cherkasy Oblast